The al-Hijarah missile was an Iraqi liquid propelled inertial Short-range ballistic missile, it was also a Scud missile and considered an upgrade of the al-Hussein missile equipped with chemical warheads. It was developed by 1990 and was first used in the Persian Gulf War where the al-Hijarah missile would release poison clouds and kill personnel on grounds as well as ignite oil wells. One al-Hijarah missile was confirmed to have been fired at Israel during the Gulf War where one landed near Dimona, it was revealed that the missile had a concrete filled warhead.

Characteristics
The al-Hijarah missile warhead was probably filled with chemical weapons and biological weapons possessed by Iraq at that time like anthrax, botulinum toxin, aflatoxin, sarin, cyclosarin and VX nerve agent. The al-Hijarah missile being a version of the al Hussein also suffered from flight instability and improper guidance. Iraq itself at that time was almost fully indigenous when it came to ballistic missile components and only lacked the ability to locally manufacture Gyroscopes.

References 

Chemical weapons
Scud missiles
Military history of Iraq
Short-range ballistic missiles of Iraq
Ballistic missiles of Iraq
Surface-to-surface missiles of Iraq
Weapons and ammunition introduced in 1990
Theatre ballistic missiles